Harpalus fulvipennis is a species of ground beetle in the subfamily Harpalinae. It was described by Maximilien Chaudoir in 1843.

References

fulvipennis
Beetles described in 1843